Grenville Turner  (born 1 November 1936, in Todmorden) is a research professor at the University of Manchester. He is one of the pioneers of cosmochemistry.

Education 
 Todmorden Grammar School
 St. John's College, Cambridge (MA)
 Balliol College, Oxford

In 1962, he was awarded his D.Phil. (Oxford University's equivalent of a PhD) in nuclear physics.

Career 
 University of California, Berkeley: assistant professor, 1962–64
 University of Sheffield: lecturer in physics, 1964–74, senior lecturer 1974–79, reader 1979–80, professor 1980–88
 Caltech: research associate, 1970–71
 University of Manchester: professor of isotope geochemistry, Department of Earth Sciences, 1988–
 Member of committees for SERC, the British National Space Centre and PPARC

Scientific work 
Professor Turner has been a leading figure in cosmochemistry since the 1960s. His pioneering work on rare gases in meteorites led him to develop the argon–argon dating technique that demonstrated the great age of meteorites and provided a precise chronology of rocks brought back by the Apollo missions. He was one of the few UK scientists to be a Principal Investigator of these Apollo samples.

His argon-dating technique involved stepped pyrolysis of the rocks to force out the argon, then determining the isotopic ratios in the gas by mass spectrometry. This was later refined by the use of lasers. These techniques have been invaluable to cosmochemists and geochemists, and have been applied (by Turner and others) to determine the geochronology of diamonds and inclusions in them, and the precise ages of mantle and crustal rocks from the Earth.

He went on to develop even better techniques, such as iodine-xenon chronology. He used laser resonance ionisation of xenon to measure samples with only a few thousand atoms of xenon; this enabled him to get accurate data from tiny samples, including individual chondrules. He could even trace secondary processes, such as alteration by heat, fluids or shock.

Turner set up the first ion microprobe in the United Kingdom intended for use primarily for examining extraterrestrial material. He used it to measure oxygen-isotope variations in the Martian meteorite ALH 84001. His results cast light on the environment in which the carbonate grains and so-called microfossils in that meteorite formed.

He was a founder member, and continues to be a leader, of the UK Cosmochemical Analysis Network, a network of laboratories in research institutions that analyse extraterrestrial material.

Despite having formally retired, he continues to be an active researcher. In 2004, he announced a plutonium-xenon technique for dating terrestrial materials.

Honours and awards 
Fellow of the Royal Society, 1980 (member of Council 1990–92)
Fellow, Meteoritical Society, 1980
Rumford Medal of the Royal Society, 1996
Fellow, Geochemical Society and European Association of Geochemistry 1996
Fellow, American Geophysical Union, 1998
Leonard Medal of the Meteoritical Society, 1999
Urey Medal of the European Association of Geochemistry, 2002
Gold Medal of the Royal Astronomical Society for geophysics, 2004

References 
 Debrett's People of Today, 2006
 Who's Who, 2006
 The Observatory, October 2005, p285-6

1936 births
Living people
Academics of the University of Sheffield
British physicists
Fellows of the Royal Society
People from Todmorden
Recipients of the Gold Medal of the Royal Astronomical Society
Fellows of the American Geophysical Union
British geochemists
Alumni of St John's College, Cambridge